Amer Taher Abou Zeid Alsayed, publicly known as Taher Abou Zeid, or Taher Abouzaid ( both are correct translations from the original alphabet in ) is the Egyptian Minister of State for Sports and a retired footballer. He played as a midfielder for Al Ahly and the Egyptian national team.

Sports career

In the FIFA U20 World Cup 1981 Taher Abouzaid was the top-scorer of the Egyptian team and the scorer of the World Cup. For many years Abouzaid played for the Egypt national football team. In the 1984 African Cup of Nations he was also the top scorer with four goals. In the 1986 African Cup of Nations he was the Egyptian team leading scorer helping his team to win the African Cup of Nations 1986. He also played in the 1990 FIFA World Cup finals. Abouzaid also played for Egypt at the 1984 Summer Olympics.

He was on the Al-Ahly's board of directors.

Honours 
Personal
 Top Scorer of the FIFA U20 World Cup 1981.
 Top Scorer of the African Cup of Nations 1984.
 Second best African footballer of the year 1984.
 CAF official selection Africa all-star team 1986.
 Scored Seven goals for Egypt in African Cups of Nations
 Scored 23 Goals for Ahly in African Club Cups
 Winner 1986 African Cup of Nations.

International Career(Egypt)
 Represented Egypt in 1981 FIFA U20 World Cup. (Top-scorer)
 Represented Egypt in the 1984 African Cup of Nations. (Top-scorer)
 Represented Egypt in the 1986 African Cup of Nations. ( CAF all-star team).
 Represented Egypt in the 1984 Summer Olympics.
 Represented Egypt in FIFA World Cup 1990.

Club Career (Ahly)
 7 Egyptian League titles 1979–1980,1980–81,1981–82,1984–85,1985–86,1986–87,1988–89.
 8 Egyptian Soccer Cup titles 1980–81, 1982–83, 1983–84, 1984–85, 1988–89, 1990–91, 1991–92, 1992–93
 2 African Champions League 1982, 1987
 3 African Cup titles 1984, 1985, 1986
 1 Afro-Asian Cup 1988

References

External links

Egyptian footballers
Egypt international footballers
Al Ahly SC players
1962 births
Living people
1990 FIFA World Cup players
Footballers at the 1984 Summer Olympics
Olympic footballers of Egypt
1984 African Cup of Nations players
1986 African Cup of Nations players
Africa Cup of Nations-winning players
Egyptian Premier League players
Association football midfielders
People from Asyut Governorate
Sports ministers of Egypt